Garibaldi Museum may refer to:

 Garibaldi Museum (Como), a museum dedicated to Giuseppe Garibaldi in Como, Italy
 Garibaldi Museum (Garibaldi, Oregon), an Oregon museum focusing on Captain Robert Gray
 Garibaldi-Meucci Museum, a museum of Italian-American heritage and culture in New York